The BMW F series is a family of parallel-twin engine dual-sport motorcycles manufactured in Berlin, Germany by BMW Motorrad.  Launched in 2008, the range comprises the  F650GS, F700GS, F800GS, and F800GSA.  In 2012, the F700GS replaced the discontinued F650GS, and in 2013, the F800GSA was introduced with a  fuel tank and a larger front fairing and screen. The F800GT and F800S both have belt drive.

Models

Contrary to industry convention, each model's "number" does not refer to the engine capacity. Instead, each bike in the F-series range uses essentially the same  engine, but with different power outputs and equipment levels. The parallel-twin engine was first used in the F800S, and is also used in the F800GT, F800R and F800ST, although these bikes are tuned to deliver peak power at a different RPM from the GS models. The GS models have longer suspension travel, needed for offroad use.

The F650GS name causes further confusion as it was previously used for a  BMW bike fitted with a single-cylinder Rotax engine. It was produced from 2000–2007, then relaunched in 2009 as the G650GS, fitted with a Chinese-assembled engine of the same 652 cc capacity.

Although all bikes use the same basic engine, the F800 produces , which is  more power than the F700 and  more than the discontinued F650.

The F800 and F700 are fitted with twin brake discs on the front while the F650 was fitted with one disc. Both bikes had anti-lock brakes (ABS), which were optional on the F800 before 2013 models and all years of the F650.

Previously, only the F650 had the option of lowered suspension, which was not available on F800 models up to 2012.

Special editions

F800GS Adventure (2013+)
Includes a larger 24 litre fuel tank, reinforced rear sub-frame.

F800GS Trophy (2012)

Desert Blue and Alpine White paintwork, Black and Rally Grey seat, aluminium engine guard plate and hand protectors with large spoilers.

F800GS Triple Black (2012)

Black paintwork, Black anodised fork tubes and rims, Granite Grey frame and Nürburg Silver swing arm.

F650GS Special Edition (2012)

Sun Yellow and Black Silk Gloss paintwork, Granite Grey fork tubes, wheels and frame, Nürburg Silver swing arm, plastic engine guard plate and high windscreen.

F800GS "30 Years GS" (2010)

Alpine White paintwork with white/blue/red decals, red seat with embossed GS logo, white direction indicators, aluminium engine guard plate, hand protectors with large spoilers, heated grips, onboard computer and tinted high windscreen.

F650GS "30 Years GS" (2010)
Alpine White paintwork with white/blue/red decals, red seat with embossed GS logo, white direction indicators, Magnesium painted wheels, plastic engine guard plate, hand protectors with large spoilers, and tinted high windscreen.

2013 update

The F800GS was refreshed for the 2013 model year, and the F700GS replaced the F650GS. 
Changes for 2013 included:

References

External links

Official BMW site for F800GS

F series parallel-twin
Belt drive motorcycles
Dual-sport motorcycles
Motorcycles introduced in 2008
Motorcycles powered by straight-twin engines